The 2021 Leinster Senior Hurling Championship was the 2021 installment of the annual Leinster Senior Hurling Championship organised by Leinster GAA. Kilkenny were the defending champions and eventual champions, defeating Dublin in the final.

Teams
The Leinster championship was contested by four counties from the Irish province of Leinster, as well as one county from the province of Connacht and one county from the province of Ulster where the sport is only capable of supporting one county team at this level.

Personnel and general information

Bracket

Fixtures

Quarter-finals

Semi-finals

Relegation playoff

Final

References

Leinster
Leinster Senior Hurling Championship